Harry Hoffman Jr. is an American former tennis player of the 1950s and 1960s.

Hoffman, a native of Philadelphia, is one of two sons born to tour player Harry Hoffman Sr. He made the singles fourth round of the 1961 U.S. National Championships, where he fell to the third-seeded Roy Emerson. One of his best wins came against the then U.S. number two Frank Froehling at the Pennsylvania tournament in 1963.

References

External links
 

Year of birth missing (living people)
Living people
American male tennis players
Tennis players from Philadelphia